Blăgești may refer to several places in Romania:

 Blăgești, Bacău, a commune in Bacău County
 Blăgești, Vaslui, a commune in Vaslui County
 Blăgești, a village administered by Pașcani town, Iași County